2nd otdeleniya sovkhoza 'Maslovskiy' is a settlement in Novousmansky District, Voronezh Oblast, Russia. The population was 335 as of 2010. There are 3 streets.

Geography 
2nd otdeleniya sovkhoza 'Maslovskiy' is located 20 km southwest of Novaya Usman (the district's administrative centre) by road. Maslovka is the nearest rural locality.

References 

Rural localities in Novousmansky District